Mechanicsburg is an unincorporated community in Salt Creek Township, Decatur County, Indiana, in the United States.

History
Mechanicsburg was laid out in 1846.

References

Unincorporated communities in Decatur County, Indiana
Unincorporated communities in Indiana